Lightnin' in the Forest is a 1948 American comedy film directed by George Blair and written by John K. Butler. The film stars Lynne Roberts, Don "Red" Barry, Warren Douglas, Lorna Gray, Lucien Littlefield and Claire Du Brey. The film was released on March 25, 1948 by Republic Pictures.

Plot

Cast   
Lynne Roberts as Jerri Vail
Don "Red" Barry as Stan Martin
Warren Douglas as David Lamont
Lorna Gray as Dell Parker 
Lucien Littlefield as Joad
Claire Du Brey as Martha
Roy Barcroft as Police Lieut. Bain
Paul Harvey as Judge Waterman
Al Eben as Bud
Jerry Jerome as Stinger
George Chandler as Elevator operator
Eddie Dunn as Police Officer
Dale Van Sickel as 'Val' Valtin
Bud Wolfe as Jim Pritchard
Hank Worden as Bartender

References

External links 
 

1948 films
American comedy films
1948 comedy films
Republic Pictures films
Films directed by George Blair
American black-and-white films
1940s English-language films
1940s American films